Steve Fenton may refer to:

Steve Fenton (footballer) (born 1951), English former professional footballer
Steve Fenton (rugby league), English rugby league footballer who played in the 1970s and 1980s